The Herbst Theatre is an auditorium in the War Memorial and Performing Arts Center in the Civic Center, San Francisco.  The 928-seat hall hosts programs as diverse as City Arts & Lectures, SF Jazz, and San Francisco Performances.

Architecture and decoration
Originally designed as the Veterans Auditorium, the theatre was refurbished and renamed Herbst Theatre in 1977 in honor of brothers Herman and Maurice Herbst, whose foundation underwrote the renovations. It is entered through a foyer off of the building's main lobby. Eight large beaux-arts murals, created by Frank Brangwyn for the 1915 Panama–Pacific International Exposition, adorn the walls while overhead five chandeliers hang from the blue and gold-leaf ceiling.

United Nations Charter
On June 26, 1945, the United Nations Charter was signed on the stage of the Herbst Theatre by the group of 50 founding nations, following the two-month-long United Nations conference at the War Memorial Opera House.

See also
List of concert halls

References

External links
 Herbst Theatre at GerakanKita website

Civic Center, San Francisco
Concert halls in California
Music venues in San Francisco
San Francisco Designated Landmarks
Theatres in San Francisco